Three total lunar eclipses occurred in 1982: 

 9 January 1982 lunar eclipse
 6 July 1982 lunar eclipse
 30 December 1982 lunar eclipse

See also 
 List of 20th-century lunar eclipses
 Lists of lunar eclipses